DPW may refer to:
Deadlock Pro-Wrestling, an American professional wrestling federation
Democratic Party of Wisconsin
 Department of Public Works, alternately Public Works Department
Disney Publishing Worldwide

See also
Davis Polk & Wardwell, a law firm (commonly known as Davis Polk)
DP World, formerly Dubai Ports World, originally Dubai Ports International